Barton is a masculine given name, sometimes shortened to Bart or Barty, which may refer to:

People
 Barton Bates (1824–1892), a justice of the Supreme Court of Missouri from 1862 to 1865
 Barton Bernstein (born 1936), American historian
 Barton Biggs (1932–2012), American money manager and hedge fund founder
 Barton Booth (1681–1733), English actor
 Bart Bryant (born 1962), American golfer
 Barton Gellman (born 1960), American journalist and author
 Barton Kay Kirkham (1936–1958), American murderer
 Barton Lui Pan-To (born 1993), Hong Kong short track speed skater 
 Barton Lynch (born 1963), Australian surfer
 Barton MacLane (1902–1969), American actor, playwright and screenwriter
 Barton McLean (born 1938), American composer, performer, music reviewer and writer
 Barton Myers (born 1934), American architect
 Bart Peterson (born 1958), American lawyer and politician
 Barton C. Pope (1813/1814–), American politician
 Barty Smith (born 1952), American football player
 Barton W. Stone (1772–1844), American preacher
 Barton Yarborough (1900–1951), American actor, primarily in radio
 Barton Kyle Yount (1884–1949), United States Army lieutenant general
 Barton Zwiebach (born 1954), Peruvian physicist

Fictional characters
 Barton Fink, title character of the 1991 film Barton Fink, played by John Turturro
 Barton Hamilton, the third Green Goblin, an enemy of Spiderman

English-language masculine given names